Blades of the Musketeers is a 1953 American film adaptation of the 1844 novel The Three Musketeers for Hal Roach Studios.

It was originally shot as an episode of the 1950 TV series Magnavox Theater.

It was also known as Sword of D'artagnan.

Cast
Robert Clarke as D'Artagnan
John Hubbard as Athos
Mel Archer as Portos
Keith Richards as Aramis
Paul Cavanagh as Cardinal Richelieu
Don Beddoe as King Louis XIII
Marjorie Lord as Queen Anne
Lyn Thomas as Constance
Kristine Miller as Lady DeWinter
Charles Lang as Buckingham
Peter Mamakos as Rochefort
James Craven as De Treville
Byron Foulger as Du Verges

Production
Budd Boetticher says Hal Roach called him saying he wanted to adapt The Three Musketeers as an hour picture for television to be shot over three days. Boetticher agreed to direct it for $500 a day and says it took three and a half days. He says a year later the film was released theatrically.

Another report says the film was shot in four days.

References

External links

Blades of the Musketeers at Allmovie
Blades of the Musketeers at Letterbox DVD
Sword of D'artagnan at BFI

1953 films
American drama television films
Films directed by Budd Boetticher
1950s American films